Trent Robinson (born 15 March 1977) is an Australian professional rugby league coach who is the head coach of the Sydney Roosters in the NRL and a former professional rugby league footballer.

He has previously held coaching positions at Toulouse Olympique in the Elite One Championship and the Newcastle Knights in the NRL and was the head coach at the Catalans Dragons in the Super League.

Background
Robinson was born in Sydney, New South Wales, Australia. He attended St Gregory's College, Campbelltown[3] where his agricultural studies led to an interest in animal and wildlife conservation particularly that of the African savanna. Unfortunately his competitive rugby league commitments prevented him from pursuing this area further.

Playing career
A former student at St Gregory's College, Campbelltown, Robinson played three games from the bench for the Wests Tigers between 2000 and 2001. He was the first player to ever make his first-grade debut with Wests Tigers without having previously played first-grade with another team. In 2002, he joined the Brian Smith-coached Parramatta Eels, playing in a solitary game.

Coaching career
After a playing stint with Toulouse Olympique, Robinson succeeded Justin Morgan as coach in 2005. He was an assistant coach with the Newcastle Knights for three years before seeking a release to join Brian Smith at the Sydney Roosters. Robinson was the assistant coach in charge of defence in the Roosters' run to the 2010 NRL Grand Final.

Catalans Dragons
At the conclusion of the 2010 Super League season, the French-speaking Robinson took over from Kevin Walters as coach at Catalans Dragons.

Sydney Roosters
On 7 September 2012, it was announced that Robinson had been appointed as head coach of the Sydney Roosters on a three-year contract, commencing in 2013. At 35-years old, he became the youngest coach in the NRL.

Robinson became only the second rookie coach in the NRL to claim a minor premiership after the Roosters defeated arch rivals, the South Sydney Rabbitohs in the final round of the 2013 NRL season. He claimed Coach of the Year at the 2013 Dally M Awards, becoming the youngest winner and only the second coach in NRL history to be named the competitions' best coach in their first season.

He capped this historic season off by leading his team to a premiership title, becoming just the sixth coach to win a premiership in their rookie season. At the conclusion of the 2013 NRL season he received the Rugby League International Federation Coach of the Year award. As well as a minor premiership in 2013, he would go on to lead the Roosters to three more minor premierships in 2014, 2015 and 2018.

On 30 September 2018, Robinson coached the Roosters to their 14th premiership and their second in six years when they went on to defeat the Melbourne Storm 21–6 in the 2018 NRL Grand Final.

At the conclusion of the 2019 regular season, Robinson guided the club to a second-placed finish behind minor premiers, the Storm. Robinson would then coach the club to their second consecutive premiership as they defeated the Canberra Raiders 14–8 in the 2019 NRL Grand Final. It was the first time that a club had won consecutive premierships in a unified competition since the Brisbane Broncos achieved the feat in 1992 and 1993.

On 12 May 2021, Robinson was fined  by the NRL after calling the NRL Bunker incompetent following the Roosters 31–18 loss against Parramatta Eels in round 9 of the 2021 NRL season.
On 30 August 2021, Robinson was fined $20,000 by the NRL for comments he made about the officiating in the aftermath of the club's 54–12 loss against arch-rivals South Sydney.
Robinson coached the Sydney Roosters to sixth position in the 2022 NRL season.  The club were beaten by arch-rivals South Sydney in the first week of the finals which ended their year.

Coaching Honours
Team
NRL Premiership: 2013, 2018, 2019
World Club Challenge: 2014, 2019, 2020
NRL Nines: 2017

Individual
Dally M Coach of the Year: 2013

Statistics

Personal life
On 26 February 2020, Robinson's  Mercedes-Benz GLC 63 was stolen from his home in Waverley. The following day, the car was recovered by police at an address in Greystanes.

References

External links

1977 births
Living people
Australian rugby league coaches
Australian rugby league players
Catalans Dragons coaches
Rugby league players from Sydney
Rugby league second-rows
Rugby league props
Parramatta Eels players
Toulouse Olympique coaches
Toulouse Olympique players
Sydney Roosters coaches
Wests Tigers players